In graph theory, the blossom algorithm is an algorithm for constructing maximum matchings on graphs. The algorithm was developed by Jack Edmonds in 1961, and published in 1965. The matching is constructed by iteratively improving an initial empty matching along augmenting paths in the graph. Unlike bipartite matching, the key new idea is that an odd-length cycle in the graph (blossom) is contracted to a single vertex, with the search continuing iteratively in the contracted graph.

A major reason that the blossom algorithm is important is that it gave the first proof that a maximum-size matching could be found using a polynomial amount of computation time. Another reason is that it led to a linear programming polyhedral description of the matching polytope, yielding an algorithm for min-weight matching. 
As elaborated by Alexander Schrijver, further significance of the result comes from the fact that this was the first polytope whose proof of integrality "does not simply follow just from total unimodularity, and its description was a breakthrough in polyhedral combinatorics."

Augmenting paths

An augmenting path  is an alternating path that starts and ends at two distinct exposed vertices. Note that the number of unmatched edges in an augmenting path is greater by one than the number of matched edges, and hence the total number of edges in an augmenting path is odd. A matching augmentation along an augmenting path  is the operation of replacing  with a new matching 
.

Hence, either a matching is maximum, or it can be augmented. Thus, starting from an initial matching, we can compute a maximum matching by augmenting the current matching with augmenting paths as long as we can find them, and return whenever no augmenting paths are left. We can formalize the algorithm as follows:

    INPUT:  Graph G, initial matching M on G
    OUTPUT: maximum matching M* on G
 A1 function find_maximum_matching(G, M) : M*
 A2     P ← find_augmenting_path(G, M)
 A3     if P is non-empty then
 A4         return find_maximum_matching(G, augment M along P)
 A5     else
 A6         return M
 A7     end if
 A8 end function

We still have to describe how augmenting paths can be found efficiently. The subroutine to find them uses blossoms and contractions.

Blossoms and contractions

Finding Blossoms:
 Traverse the graph starting from an exposed vertex.
 Starting from that vertex, label it as an outer vertex .
 Alternate the labeling between vertices being inner   and outer  such that no two adjacent vertices have the same label.
 If we end up with two adjacent vertices labeled as outer   then we have an odd-length cycle and hence a blossom.

In more detail:

Thus blossoms can be contracted and search performed in the contracted graphs. This reduction is at the heart of Edmonds' algorithm.

Finding an augmenting path

The search for an augmenting path uses an auxiliary data structure consisting of a forest  whose individual trees correspond to specific portions of the graph . In fact, the forest  is the same that would be used to find maximum matchings in bipartite graphs (without need for shrinking blossoms).
In each iteration the algorithm either (1) finds an augmenting path, (2) finds a blossom and recurses onto the corresponding contracted graph, or (3) concludes there are no augmenting paths. The auxiliary structure is built by an incremental procedure discussed next.

     INPUT:  Graph G, matching M on G
     OUTPUT: augmenting path P in G or empty path if none found
 B01 function find_augmenting_path(G, M) : P
 B02    F ← empty forest
 B03    unmark all vertices and edges in G, mark all edges of M
 B05    for each exposed vertex v do B06        create a singleton tree { v } and add the tree to F
 B07    end for B08    while there is an unmarked vertex v in F with distance(v, root(v)) even do B09        while there exists an unmarked edge e = { v, w } do B10            if w is not in F then'''
                    // w is matched, so add e and ws matched edge to F
 B11                x ← vertex matched to w in M
 B12                add edges { v, w } and { w, x } to the tree of v
 B13            else B14                if distance(w, root(w)) is odd then                        // Do nothing.
 B15                else B16                    if root(v) ≠ root(w) then                            // Report an augmenting path in F  { e }.
 B17                        P ← path (root(v) → ... → v) → (w → ... → root(w))
 B18                        return P
 B19                    else                            // Contract a blossom in G and look for the path in the contracted graph.
 B20                        B ← blossom formed by e and edges on the path v → w in T
 B21                        G’, M’ ← contract G and M by B
 B22                        P’ ← find_augmenting_path(G’, M’)
 B23                        P ← lift P’ to G
 B24                        return P
 B25                    end if B26                end if B27            end if B28            mark edge e
 B29        end while B30        mark vertex v
 B31    end while B32    return empty path
 B33 end functionExamples
The following four figures illustrate the execution of the algorithm. Dashed lines indicate edges that are currently not present in the forest. First, the algorithm processes an out-of-forest edge that causes the expansion of the current forest (lines B10 – B12).

Next, it detects a blossom and contracts the graph (lines B20 – B21).

Finally, it locates an augmenting path  in the contracted graph (line B22) and lifts it to the original graph (line B23). Note that the ability of the algorithm to contract blossoms is crucial here; the algorithm cannot find  in the original graph directly because only out-of-forest edges between vertices at even distances from the roots are considered on line B17 of the algorithm.

Analysis

The forest  constructed by the  function is an alternating forest.
  contains exactly one exposed vertex  called the tree root
 its connected components are alternating trees, and

Bipartite matching

In that case, blossoms will never be found and one can simply remove lines B20 – B24 of the algorithm. The algorithm thus reduces to the standard algorithm to construct maximum cardinality matchings in bipartite graphs where we repeatedly search for an augmenting path by a simple graph traversal: this is for instance the case of the Ford–Fulkerson algorithm.

Weighted matching

This problem can be solved by a combinatorial algorithm that uses the unweighted Edmonds's algorithm as a subroutine. Kolmogorov provides an efficient C++ implementation of this.

References

Graph algorithms
Matching (graph theory)